Pomacentrus nigromarginatus, the blackmargined damsel, is a damselfish from the Western Pacific. It occasionally makes its way into the aquarium trade. It grows to a size of 8 cm in length.

References

External links
 

nigromarginatus
Taxa named by Gerald R. Allen
Fish described in 1973